The Rookery, or 125 Hospital Street, is a substantial Georgian townhouse in Nantwich, Cheshire, England. It is at the end of Hospital Street, on the north side, at the junction with Millstone Lane (at ). The existing building dates from the mid-18th century and is listed at grade II; English Heritage describes it as "good" in the listing. Nikolaus Pevsner describes it as "square and stately." It incorporates an earlier timber-framed house at the rear, which probably dates from the late 16th or early 17th century.

The Rookery is one of a group of houses dating originally from the 15th and 16th centuries at the end of Hospital Street, which include Churche's Mansion, number 116 and numbers 140–142. These buildings survived the fire of 1583, which destroyed the town end of Hospital Street together with much of the centre of Nantwich. The Rookery is believed to stand near the site of the medieval Hospital of St Nicholas, which gives Hospital Street its name.

Description
The Rookery is a large detached Georgian building of two storeys, in red brick with stone dressings under a tiled roof. The front façade faces Millstone Lane and is set well back from the street behind a brick wall. This face has two projecting end wings, with decorative stone quoins at each corner. The main central doorway is flanked by paired Roman Doric columns and has a fanlight and curved pediment above. Two large three-light sash windows to the ground floor and three similar windows to the first floor all have wooden pilasters; the main doorway is also flanked by single-light windows. On the interior, the main staircase is described as "good" by English Heritage.

The existing building incorporates an earlier timber-framed house at the rear, which probably originally had a central hall and flanking wings. Local historian Jeremy Lake has dated the roof timbers as late 16th or early 17th century.

In 2015, after many years of neglect, The Rookery was acquired by local developer ISL who restored the building in line with its Grade II status. The works included underpinning to include a new waterproof structural floor, damp proofing, a roof renovation and strengthening with insulation, roof valleys were replaced with lead, a new internal structural timber frame and insulation. The building was completely repointed and missing bricks were replaced with new hand-made Cheshire bricks, the sash windows were renovated with new mechanisms and new hand-made casements and fitted with toughened glazing. As part of the renovation, The Rookery was converted into five apartments.

See also
Listed buildings in Nantwich

References

Sources
Hall J. A History of the Town and Parish of Nantwich, or Wich Malbank, in the County Palatine of Chester (2nd edn) (E. J. Morten; 1972)
Lake J. The Great Fire of Nantwich (Shiva Publishing; 1983)
Pevsner N, Hubbard E. The Buildings of England: Cheshire (Penguin Books; 1971)
Simpson R. Crewe and Nantwich: A Pictorial History (Phillimore; 1991)

Houses completed in the 18th century
Nantwich, Rookery, The
Rookery
Timber framed buildings in Cheshire